2nd Guards Division can refer to:

 2nd Guards Division (Imperial Japanese Army)
 2nd Guards Motor Rifle Division
 2nd Guards Infantry Division (Russian Empire)

See also 
2nd Division (disambiguation)